Bill Reid Remembers is a Canadian short documentary film, directed by Alanis Obomsawin and released in 2022. The film is a portrait of the life and career of influential Haida artist Bill Reid.

The film premiered at the 2022 Hot Docs Canadian International Documentary Festival. It was also screened at the DOXA Documentary Film Festival as part of Landscapes of Resistance, a program of films about indigenous resistance to colonialism.

The film was named to the Toronto International Film Festival's annual year-end Canada's Top Ten list for 2022. It received a Canadian Screen Award nomination for Best Short Documentary at the 11th Canadian Screen Awards in 2023.

References

2022 films
2022 short documentary films
Canadian short documentary films
Films directed by Alanis Obomsawin
National Film Board of Canada documentaries
Documentary films about visual artists
2020s English-language films
2020s Canadian films